B. Wayne Kingery (June 5, 1927 – June 2, 2016) was an American football halfback and defensive back who played for the Baltimore Colts. He played college football at McNeese State University, having previously attended Lake Charles High School. He was inducted into the McNeese State Hall of Fame in 1980.

References

1927 births
2016 deaths
American football halfbacks
LSU Tigers football players
McNeese Cowboys football players
Baltimore Colts players
Players of American football from Louisiana
Sportspeople from Lake Charles, Louisiana
Baltimore Colts (1947–1950) players